The Treaty of Taastrup (Freden i Høje Taastrup Præstegård) was a preliminary accord signed on 11 February 1658 between King Charles X Gustav of Sweden and King Frederick III of Denmark and Norway. The treaty was signed at the Høje Taastrup Church in Taastrup, Denmark. Individuals including Count Corfitz Ulfeldt participated in the peace negotiations after Denmark-Norway lost in the Second Northern War. The agreement was finalized through the Treaty of Roskilde. The original copy of the treaty is at the National Museum of Denmark (Nationalmuseet) in Copenhagen.

See also
List of treaties

References

Northern Wars
1658 in Denmark
1658 treaties
Treaties of Denmark–Norway
Treaties of the Swedish Empire
1658 in Sweden